Istanbul's second electoral district is one of three divisions of the Istanbul electoral district for the purpose of elections to Grand National Assembly of Turkey.  It elects twenty-seven members of parliament (deputies) to represent the district for a four-year term by the D'Hondt method, a party-list proportional representation system.

The district partially covers the European side of the Province of Istanbul, on the west of the Bosphorus. The third electoral district is situated to the west while the first electoral district occupies the Anatolian side of Istanbul on the east side of the Bosphorus.

Division
The first electoral district contains the following Istanbul administrative districts (ilçe):

Bayrampaşa
Beşiktaş
Beyoğlu
Esenler
Eyüp
Fatih
Gaziosmanpaşa
Kağıthane
Sarıyer
Sultangazi
Şişli
Zeytinburnu

Members 
Population reviews of each electoral district are conducted before each general election, which can lead to certain districts being granted a smaller or greater number of parliamentary seats. Istanbul (II) gained 6 extra seats for the 2011 general election, thus electing 27 seats as opposed to 2q that it elected in 1999, 2002 and 2007.

General elections

2011

References

Electoral districts of Turkey